Trevor Bolin is the leader of the Conservative Party of British Columbia.  On April 9, 2019, he was elected as the leader of the party.  He is a city councillor in Fort St. John and a real estate agent owning RE/MAX Action Realty. Bolin also owns Burger King locations in Fort St. John, Dawson Creek, and Grande Prairie, Alberta.

On March 3, 2023, he announced that he would be stepping down as leader of the party, becoming the interim leader until a new leader is selected. He also announced that he would again be the candidate for Peace River North in 2024.

Electoral record

References

Living people
Leaders of political parties in Canada
British Columbia Conservative Party leaders
British Columbia Conservative Party candidates in British Columbia provincial elections
Date of birth missing (living people)

4. ^           https://www.dawsoncreekmirror.ca/local-news/burger-king-destined-to-arrive-in-dawson-creek-3505263